The Gorchha or گورچھا is a caste found in the provinces of Punjab , Sindh and Eastern parts of Khyber Pakhtunkhwa in Pakistan. They are jutt by origin. They are mostly Saraiki and Sindhi speaking 
They are present along the bank of River Indus.The Gorchha are by origin old settlements along the River Indus. Over time in different areas name Gorchha has been corrupted to Gorchani,Gorkha

The Gorchha caste is found in vast amounts in cities of D.G Khan, Bhakkar, Leiah , Mianwali and in many parts of province Sindh where they are related mostly with agriculture.

References 

Social groups of Uttar Pradesh
Social groups of Pakistan